Blas Durán (born Nagua, 3 September 1949) is a Dominican singer. Durán first became known through the song "Clavelito" (1970), but is best known for the introduction of electric guitar into bachata music with his 1986 bachata-merengue "Consejo a las mujeres".

References

Living people
1949 births
Bachata singers